Diurna is a Latin & Italian word relating to 'day'. Sometimes refers to:

 Acta Diurna ('Daily Acts'), the newspaper of Rome, recording legal matters & public news of the Republic & Empire
 Encyclia diurna, a species of orchid